Hamilton Field  was formerly a public-use airport located two nautical miles (4 km) east of the central business district of Derby, a city in Sedgwick County, Kansas, United States. The land the airport sat on has since been subdivided for residential use, and is no longer in operation. While it was active, Hamilton Field was privately owned by Hamilton Land Group LLC.

Facilities and aircraft 
It had one runway designated 17/35 with a 2,500 x 35 ft (762 x 11 m) turf surface. For the 12-month period ending June 8, 2007, the airport had 2,500 aircraft operations, with an average of 208 operations per month, all of which were categorized as general aviation. At that time there were 30 aircraft based at Hamilton Field. Of these 30, 87% were single-engine aircraft while only 13% were ultralight aircraft.

History
In May of 2002 a privately owned 75% scale Fokker DVII crashed at Hamilton Field when winds blew the plane into a stand of trees just after takeoff.  While the plane was significantly damaged, the pilot was not injured.

References

External links 

Defunct airports in Kansas
Airports in Kansas
Buildings and structures in Sedgwick County, Kansas
Transportation in Sedgwick County, Kansas